Catherine Creek is a stream in the U.S. state of Washington. It is a tributary of the Kettle River.

Catherine Creek has the name of Catherine Alec.

See also
List of rivers of Washington

References

Rivers of Ferry County, Washington
Rivers of Washington (state)